A cocktail strainer is a metal bar accessory used to remove ice from a mixed drink as it is poured into the serving glass.  A type of sieve, the strainer is placed over the mouth of the glass or shaker in which the beverage was prepared; small holes in the device allow only liquids to pass as the beverage is poured.

There are two common types of strainers.  The Hawthorne strainer is a disc (called the "rim") with a handle and two or more stabilizing prongs.  A metal spring fixed around the edge of the rim rolls inward to fit inside the glass.  The rim of the strainer does not need to touch the rim of the glass, as the spring inside filters out the ice.  

The Julep strainer is shaped like a bowl with a handle, and will fit tightly into a mixing glass or shaker when inserted at the proper angle.  Liquid passes through holes or slits in the bowl.

External links
 
 
 Types of strainers
Drinkware
Bartending equipment